William Irvine  was consecrated a college bishop (i.e., a bishop without a diocese), on 22 October 1718.

References

College bishops